The Guess Who are a Canadian rock band, originating as Chad Allan and the Reflections in 1962, and adopting the name The Guess Who in 1965. Formed as a garage rock band, their best-known works are in the pop rock and psychedelic rock genres. 

They were most successful from 1968 to 1975, under the leadership of singer/keyboardist Burton Cummings. During that period they released eleven studio albums, all of which reached the charts in Canada and the United States; their 1970 album American Woman reached no. 1 in Canada and no. 9 in the United States, and five other albums reached the top ten in Canada. They also achieved five number one singles in Canada and two in the United States.

Studio albums

Credited to "Chad Allan & the Expressions (Guess Who?)"
(both names shown on the album cover)
(no RPM Top Album charts until 1967)

As The Guess Who?

As The Guess Who

Post Burton Cummings–era albums credited to The Guess Who

Live albums

Compilation albums

Singles
Note that almost all of the band's early tracks, originally issued by "Chad Allan and the Reflections", "Bob Ashley and the Reflections" or "Chad Allan and the Original Reflections", were later re-issued on albums that were jointly credited to "Chad Allan & the Expressions"/"Guess Who?" (i.e. both group names appeared on the album cover).

Music videos

Notes

References

External links
 

Discographies of Canadian artists
Discography 
Rock music group discographies